Wyles may refer to:

Chris Wyles (born 1983), International rugby union player 
Harry Wyles (1922–1982), English footballer
Lilian Wyles (1885–1975), British police officer